Laya or  Layah  is a village in the Forécariah Prefecture in the Kindia Region of southwestern Guinea.

References

Populated places in the Kindia Region